Petar Bozhilov (5 September 1963 – 16 December 2012) was a Bulgarian sprint canoeist who competed in the late 1980s. At the 1988 Summer Olympics in Seoul, he finished fourth in the C-2 500 m event and ninth in the C-2 1000 m event.

References
Petar Bozhilov's profile at Sports Reference.com
Petar Bozhilov's obituary 

1963 births
2012 deaths
Bulgarian male canoeists
Canoeists at the 1988 Summer Olympics
Olympic canoeists of Bulgaria